Delhi Public School, Ranchi is a higher secondary school in the city of Ranchi, Jharkhand, India. It was established on 17 July 1989. The school is a co-educational institution recognised by the Directorate of Education and affiliated to Central Board of Secondary Education under All India 10+2 pattern. It is managed by the Delhi Public School Society.

History 
"Service Before Self" is the motto of the school. The students of the school are referred to as "dipsites". On 24 June 2009,  APJ Abdul Kalam visited the school campus and interacted with the students. The school hosted the National Inter DPS Multi Sports Meet for girls in October 2011.In 2018 DPS started humanities stream. The subjects for humanities are economics, political science,  History and sociology.

The principal of the school is Dr. Ram Singh.

Location and Campus 
The school is located in the SAIL Satellite Colony, Ranchi. School has strength of 4750 students and has 40 buses that provide a mode of conveyance. The campus is spread in 20 acres and has a large playground whereas three other small playgrounds.

See also
Delhi Public School Society
Education in India
CBSE

References

External links

High schools and secondary schools in Jharkhand
Schools in Ranchi
Delhi Public School Society
Educational institutions established in 1989
1989 establishments in Bihar